This page details the all-time statistics, records, and other achievements pertaining to the Los Angeles Lakers. The Los Angeles Lakers are an American professional basketball team currently playing in the National Basketball Association.

Laker individual accomplishments

NBA MVP
Kareem Abdul-Jabbar – 1976, 1977, 1980
Magic Johnson – 1987, 1989, 1990
Shaquille O'Neal – 2000
Kobe Bryant – 2008

NBA Finals MVP
Jerry West – 1969
Wilt Chamberlain – 1972
Magic Johnson – 1980, 1982, 1987
Kareem Abdul-Jabbar – 1985
James Worthy – 1988
Shaquille O'Neal – 2000, 2001, 2002
Kobe Bryant – 2009, 2010
LeBron James – 2020

NBA Defensive Player of the Year
Michael Cooper – 1987

NBA Coach of the Year
Bill Sharman – 1972
Pat Riley – 1990
Del Harris – 1995

NBA Sixth Man of the Year
Lamar Odom – 2011

NBA Executive of the Year
Jerry West – 1995

Rookie of the Year
Elgin Baylor – 1959

NBA All-Rookie First Team
Bill Hewitt – 1969
Dick Garrett – 1970
Jim Price – 1973
Brian Winters – 1975
Norm Nixon – 1978
Magic Johnson – 1980
James Worthy – 1983
Byron Scott – 1984
Vlade Divac – 1990
Eddie Jones – 1995
Jordan Clarkson – 2015
Kyle Kuzma – 2018

NBA All-Rookie Second Team
Nick Van Exel – 1994
Kobe Bryant – 1997
Travis Knight – 1997
D'Angelo Russell – 2016
Brandon Ingram – 2017
Lonzo Ball – 2018

J. Walter Kennedy Citizenship Award
Michael Cooper – 1986
Magic Johnson – 1992
Ron Artest – 2011
Pau Gasol – 2012

NBA Community Assist Award
Pau Gasol – 2012

NBA scoring champion
George Mikan – 1949–1951
Jerry West – 1970
Shaquille O'Neal – 2000
Kobe Bryant – 2006, 2007

NBA assist leaders
Jerry West – 1972
Magic Johnson – 1983, 1984, 1986, 1987
LeBron James – 2020

All-NBA First Team
George Mikan – 1949–1954
Jim Pollard – 1949, 1950
Elgin Baylor – 1959–1965, 1967–1969
Jerry West – 1962–1967, 1970–1973
Gail Goodrich – 1974
Kareem Abdul-Jabbar – 1976, 1977, 1980, 1981, 1984, 1986
Magic Johnson – 1983–1991
Shaquille O'Neal – 1998, 2000–2004
Kobe Bryant – 2002–2004, 2006–2013
Anthony Davis – 2020
LeBron James – 2020

All-NBA Second Team
Vern Mikkelsen – 1951–1953, 1955
Jim Pollard – 1952, 1954
Slater Martin – 1955, 1956
Clyde Lovellette – 1956
Dick Garmaker – 1957
Jerry West – 1968, 1969
Wilt Chamberlain – 1972
Kareem Abdul-Jabbar – 1978, 1979, 1983, 1985
Magic Johnson – 1982
Shaquille O'Neal – 1999
Kobe Bryant – 2000, 2001
Pau Gasol – 2011
Andrew Bynum – 2012
LeBron James – 2021

All-NBA Third Team
James Worthy – 1990, 1991
Shaquille O'Neal – 1997
Kobe Bryant – 1999, 2005
Pau Gasol – 2009, 2010
Dwight Howard – 2013
LeBron James – 2019, 2022

NBA All-Defensive First Team
Jerry West – 1970–1973
Wilt Chamberlain – 1972, 1973
Kareem Abdul-Jabbar – 1979–1981
Michael Cooper – 1982, 1984, 1985, 1987, 1988
Kobe Bryant – 2000, 2003, 2004, 2006–2011
Anthony Davis – 2020

NBA All-Defensive Second Team
Jerry West – 1969
Kareem Abdul-Jabbar – 1976–1978, 1984
Michael Cooper – 1981, 1983, 1986
A. C. Green – 1989
Eddie Jones – 1998
Shaquille O'Neal – 2000, 2001, 2003
Kobe Bryant – 2001, 2002, 2012

NBA 25th Anniversary Team
George Mikan – 1947–1954, 1956

NBA 35th Anniversary Team
George Mikan – 1947–1954, 1956
Kareem Abdul-Jabbar – 1975–1989
Elgin Baylor – 1958–1971
Wilt Chamberlain – 1968–1973
Jerry West – 1960–1974

NBA 50th Anniversary Team
Kareem Abdul-Jabbar – 1975–1989
Elgin Baylor – 1958–1971
Wilt Chamberlain – 1968–1973
Jerry West – 1960–1974
George Mikan – 1947–1954, 1956
Magic Johnson – 1979–1991, 1996
Karl Malone – 2003–2004
Shaquille O'Neal – 1996–2004
James Worthy – 1982–1994

NBA 75th Anniversary Team
Kareem Abdul-Jabbar – 1975–1989
Elgin Baylor – 1958–1971
Kobe Bryant – 1996–2016
Wilt Chamberlain – 1968–1973
Anthony Davis – 2019–present
LeBron James – 2018–present
Magic Johnson – 1979–1991, 1996
Karl Malone – 2003–2004
Bob McAdoo – 1981–1985
George Mikan – 1947–1954, 1956
Steve Nash – 2012–2015
Shaquille O'Neal – 1996–2004
Gary Payton – 2003–2004
Dennis Rodman – 1999
Jerry West – 1960–1974
James Worthy – 1982–1994
Russell Westbrook – 2021–2023
Carmelo Anthony – 2021–2022

NBA All-Star Weekend

All-Star
 George Mikan – 1951–1954
 Vern Mikkelsen – 1951–1953, 1955–1957
 Jim Pollard – 1951, 1952, 1954, 1955
 Slater Martin – 1953–1957
 Clyde Lovellette – 1956
 Dick Garmaker – 1957–1960
 Larry Foust – 1958, 1959
 Elgin Baylor – 1959–1965, 1967–1970
 Rod Hundley – 1960, 1961
 Jerry West – 1961–1974
 Frank Selvy – 1962
 Rudy LaRusso – 1962, 1963, 1966
 Darrall Imhoff – 1967
 Archie Clark – 1968
 Wilt Chamberlain – 1969, 1971–1973
 Gail Goodrich – 1972–1975
 Kareem Abdul-Jabbar – 1976, 1977, 1979–1989
 Magic Johnson – 1980, 1982–1992
 Jamaal Wilkes – 1981, 1983
 Norm Nixon – 1982
 James Worthy – 1986–1992
 A. C. Green – 1990
 Cedric Ceballos – 1995
 Shaquille O'Neal – 1997, 1998, 2000–2004
 Eddie Jones – 1997, 1998
 Kobe Bryant – 1998, 2000–2016
 Nick Van Exel – 1998
 Pau Gasol – 2009–2011
 Andrew Bynum – 2012
 Dwight Howard – 2013
 LeBron James – 2019–2023
 Anthony Davis – 2020, 2021
 No All-Star game in 1999, due to a lockout that shortened the season.

All-Star Most Valuable Player
George Mikan – 1953
Elgin Baylor – 1959
Jerry West – 1972
Magic Johnson – 1990, 1992
Shaquille O'Neal – 2000, 2004
Kobe Bryant – 2002, 2007, 2009, 2011

Slam Dunk champion
Kobe Bryant – 1997

All-Star Rookie/Sophomore Challenge Game

 Nick Van Exel – 1994
 Eddie Jones – 1995*
 Kobe Bryant – 1997
 Derek Fisher – 1997
 Travis Knight – 1997
 Andrew Bynum – 2007
 Jordan Farmar – 2007, 2008
 Jordan Clarkson – 2016
 D'Angelo Russell – 2016, 2017
 Brandon Ingram – 2017, 2018
 Kyle Kuzma – 2018, 2019
 Lonzo Ball – 2018, 2019

NBA All-Star Game head coaches
 John Kundla – 1951–1954
 Fred Schaus – 1962–1964, 1966–1967
 Bill Sharman – 1972–1973
 Pat Riley – 1982–1983, 1985–1990
 Phil Jackson – 2000, 2009
 Frank Vogel – 2020

Los Angeles Lakers Basketball Hall of Famers
See Los Angeles Lakers#Hall of Famers and Naismith Memorial Basketball Hall of Fame

4 Adrian Dantley
8/24 Kobe Bryant
10 Steve Nash
11 Bob McAdoo
11 Karl Malone
11 Charlie Scott
12 Vlade Divac
13 Wilt Chamberlain
17 Jim Pollard
19 Vern Mikkelsen
20 Gary Payton
22 Elgin Baylor
22 Slater Martin
23 Lou Hudson
23 Mitch Richmond
25 Gail Goodrich
31 Spencer Haywood
31 Zelmo Beaty
32 Magic Johnson
33 Kareem Abdul-Jabbar
34 Clyde Lovellette
34 Shaquille O'Neal
42 Connie Hawkins
42 James Worthy
44 Jerry West
52 Jamaal Wilkes
73 Dennis Rodman
99 George Mikan
Coach Bill Sharman
Coach John Kundla
Coach Pat Riley
Coach Phil Jackson
Assistant coach Tex Winter
Coach Rudy Tomjanovich
MIC Chick Hearn
General Manager Pete Newell
Owner Jerry Buss

Retired jerseys

8 Kobe Bryant, G, 1996–2006
13 Wilt Chamberlain, C, 1968–1973
16 Pau Gasol, C, 2008-2014
22 Elgin Baylor, F, 1958–71 (including team's last two seasons in Minneapolis)
24 Kobe Bryant, G, 2006–2016
25 Gail Goodrich, G, 1965–68 and 1970–76
32 Magic Johnson, G, 1979–91 and 1995–96; Head Coach 1994
33 Kareem Abdul-Jabbar, C, 1975–89
34 Shaquille O'Neal, C, 1996–2004 
42 James Worthy, F, 1982–94
44 Jerry West, G, 1960–74; Head Coach, 1976–79; General Manager, 1981–2002
52 Jamaal Wilkes, F, 1977–85 
99 George Mikan, C, 1947–56 (did not play in 1954–55)
MIC Chick Hearn, Broadcaster, 1960–2002

The NBA announced on August 12, 2022 that no. 6 would be retired league-wide in honor of Bill Russell. Current players wearing no. 6, such as the Lakers' LeBron James, would be grandfathered by the rule.
 
Honored Minneapolis Lakers: Next to their retired numbers, the Lakers have hung a banner with the names of five Hall-of-Famers who were instrumental to the franchise's success during its days in Minneapolis:

17 Jim Pollard, F, 1947–55
19 Vern Mikkelsen, F, 1949–59
22 Slater Martin, G, 1949–56
34 Clyde Lovellette, F-C, 1953–57
 John Kundla, Coach, 1947–59
Baylor's no. 22 jersey was retired by the Lakers; 34 was retired for Shaquille O'Neal in April 2013; 17 was previously worn by Andrew Bynum and Rick Fox, and neither 19 nor 99 is currently being worn.

Olympic team selection

 Clyde Lovellette – 1952 
 Jerry West – 1960 
 Walt Hazzard – 1964 
 Magic Johnson – 1992 
 Shaquille O'Neal – 1996 
 Kobe Bryant – 2008  2012 
 Pau Gasol – 2008  2012

NBA regular season records set/tied by Los Angeles Lakers

Individual records

Minneapolis/Los Angeles Lakers Accomplishments & Records

 Most consecutive games won – 33, 1971-11-05 – 1972-01-07
 Most consecutive games won, one season – 33, 1971-11-05 – 1972-01-07
 Highest winning percentage, road games, season – .816, 1971–72 (31–7)
 Most consecutive road games won – 16, 1971-11-06 – 1972-01-07
 Most consecutive overtime games, season – 3, 1991-11-01 – 1991-11-05
 shared with 15 other teams
 Fewest opponent points, first half – 19, vs. L.A. Clippers, 1999-12-14
 Fewest opponent points, second quarter – 3, vs. L.A. Clippers, 1999-12-14
 Fewest opponent points, third quarter – 2, vs. Dallas, 1997-04-06
 Fewest points, overtime period – 0, vs. Detroit, 1989-12-01
 shared with seven other teams
 Most players, 2,000-or-more points, season – 2, 1964–65 (West 2,292; Baylor 2,009)
 shared with four other teams
 Most players, 40-or-more points, game – 2, at San Francisco, 1970-02-11 (Baylor 43, West 43)
 shared with eight other teams
 Highest field goal percentage, season – .545, 1984–85 (3,952/7,254)
 Lowest opponent field goal percentage, game – .229, vs. Milwaukee Hawks (at Buffalo, New York), 1954-11-06 (22/96)
 Lowest field goal percentage, both teams, game – .246, Milwaukee Hawks vs. Minneapolis (at Buffalo, New York), 1954-11-06 (48/195)
 Most field goals, both teams, one quarter – 40, Boston (23) vs. Minneapolis (17), 1959-02-27 (4th qtr.)
 Most field goal attempts, both teams, game – 291, Phil. Warriors (153) vs. L.A. Lakers (138), 1961-12-08 (3 OT)
 Most field goal attempts, both teams, one half – 153, Boston (80) vs. Minneapolis (73), 1959-02-27 (2nd half)
 Lowest three-point field goal percentage, season – .104, 1982–83 (10/96)

 Fewest three-point field goals per game, season – 0.12, 1982–83 (10/82)
 shared with Atlanta, 1980–81 (10/82)
 Most free throws made, both teams, one quarter – 41, Milwaukee (22) vs. L.A. Lakers (19), 2001-03-21
 Fewest free throw attempts, both teams, game – 12, L.A. Lakers (3) vs. San Diego Clippers (9), 1980-03-28
 Most rebounds, both teams, game – 188, Phil. Warriors (98) vs. L.A. Lakers (90), 1961-12-08 (3 OT)
 Fewest opponent defensive rebounds, game – 10, vs. Utah, 1990-04-01
 Fewest defensive rebounds, both teams, game – 31, Utah (10) at L.A. Lakers (21), 1990-04-01
 Most defensive rebounds, one half – 36, vs. Seattle, 1973-10-19
 Most assists per game, season – 31.4, 1984–85 (2,575/82)
 Fewest opponent assists, game – 3, vs. Boston (at Louisville, Kentucky), 1956-11-28
 shared with three other teams
 Fewest assists, both teams, game – 10, Boston vs. Minneapolis (at Louisville, Kentucky), 1956-11-28
 Fewest disqualifications per game, season – 0.02, 1988–89 (2/82)
 Most steals, both teams, game – 40, Golden State (24) vs. L.A. Lakers (16), 1975-01-21
 shared with two other pairs of teams
 Fewest steals, both teams, game – 2, L.A. Lakers (1) vs. Miami (1), 2006-01-16
 shared with three other pairs of teams
 Most steals, one quarter – 11, vs. Chicago, 1982-03-12; at Dallas, 1994-12-13
 shared with six other teams
 Fewest blocked shots, both teams, game – 0, L.A. Lakers vs. Houston, 1978-01-22
 shared with 11 other pairs of teams

NBA playoff records set by the Los Angeles Lakers

 Most NBA Finals appearances – 32 times
 Best postseason record – 15–1 (2001)
 Most Playoff Games Won – 421

Franchise records for regular season

Unless otherwise stated, statistics/records are accurate as at the end of the 2016–17 season.

Most consecutive games played
  A. C. Green – 567

Most minutes played in a game
 Norm Nixon – 64

Highest minutes per game
 Wilt Chamberlain – 43.7

Highest minutes per game in a season
 Wilt Chamberlain – 45.3

Most points scored in a game
 Kobe Bryant – 81
 Elgin Baylor – 71
 Wilt Chamberlain – 66
 Kobe Bryant – 65
 Elgin Baylor – 64

Highest career points per game
 Elgin Baylor – 27.4

Highest points per game in a season
 Elgin Baylor – 38.3 (48 games)
 Kobe Bryant – 35.4
 Elgin Baylor – 34.8
 Elgin Baylor – 34.0
 Kobe Bryant – 31.6

Most defensive rebounds (since 1973–74)
 Kareem Abdul-Jabbar – 7785
 Kobe Bryant – 5548
 Magic Johnson – 4958
 Shaquille O'Neal – 4133
 Lamar Odom – 3757

Most offensive rebounds (since 1973–74)
 Kareem Abdul-Jabbar – 2494
 A.C. Green – 2089
 Shaquille O'Neal – 1957
 Magic Johnson – 1601
 James Worthy – 1561

Most total rebounds
 Elgin Baylor – 11463
 Kareem Abdul-Jabbar – 10279
 Kobe Bryant – 7047
 Magic Johnson – 6559
 Wilt Chamberlain – 6524Most rebounds in a game Wilt Chamberlain – 42Highest rebounds per game Wilt Chamberlain – 19.2Highest rebounds per game in a season Wilt Chamberlain – 21.1Most assists in a game Magic Johnson – 24Highest career assists per game  Magic Johnson – 11.2Highest assists per game in a season  Magic Johnson – 13.1Most blocks in a game Elmore Smith – 17Highest career blocks per game Elmore Smith – 3.93Highest blocks per game in a season Elmore Smith – 4.85Most steals in a game Jerry West – 10Highest career steals per game Eddie Jones – 2.05Highest steals per game in a season Magic Johnson – 3.43Most field goals made in a game Wilt Chamberlain – 29 -Feb. 9, 1969Highest field goal percentage in a game Wilt Chamberlain – 1.000 on 14 attemptsMost three-point field goals in a game Kobe Bryant – 12 (January 7, 2003 vs Seattle SuperSonics)
 Kobe Bryant – 9 (March 28, 2008 vs Memphis Grizzlies)
 Kobe Bryant – 9 (March 22, 2005 vs Utah Jazz)
 Kobe Bryant – 9 (March 28, 2003 vs Washington Wizards)Most free throws made in a gameAnthony Davis – 26 (October 29, 2019 vs Memphis Grizzlies)
 Dwight Howard – 25 (March 12, 2013 vs Orlando Magic)
 Kobe Bryant – 23 (January 31, 2006 vs New York Knicks)
 Kobe Bryant – 23 (January 30, 2001 vs Cleveland Cavaliers)Lowest turnovers per game Mark Madsen – 0.4 (minimum 100 games played)Lowest turnovers per game in a season Stanislav Medvedenko – 0.3 (2004–05 season; minimum 41 games played)Highest assist-to-turnover ratio Sedale Threatt – 3.34Highest assist-to-turnover ratio in a season Nick Van Exel – 4.25 (1997–98 season)Most double doubles Magic Johnson – 463
 Shaquille O'Neal – 365
 Pau Gasol – 215Career triple doubles Magic Johnson – 138
 LeBron James – 32
 Elgin Baylor – 24
 Kobe Bryant – 21
 Jerry West – 16
 Kareem Abdul-Jabbar – 13
 Russell Westbrook — 10
 Wilt Chamberlain – 8
 Elmore Smith – 6
 Pau Gasol – 5
 Julius Randle – 5
 Lamar Odom – 4
 Vlade Divac — 4
 Lonzo Ball – 3
 Karl Malone – 1
 Steve Blake – 1
 Gary Payton – 1
 Jamaal Wilkes – 1
 Sam Perkins — 1
 Connie Hawkins – 1
 Jim Price – 1
 Hot Rod Hundley – 1
 Slater Martin – 1
 Rajon Rondo — 1
 Austin Reaves — 1

Career leaders

Single-season leaders

Franchise records for playoffs
Unless otherwise stated, statistics/records are correct as at the end of the 2012–13 season.Most games played Kobe Bryant – 220
 Derek Fisher – 193
 Magic Johnson – 190
 Kareem Abdul-Jabbar – 180
 Michael Cooper – 168
 Jerry West – 153
 Byron Scott – 150
 James Worthy – 143
 Elgin Baylor – 134
 A.C. Green – 126Most minutes played Kobe Bryant – 8,641
 Magic Johnson – 7,538
 Kareem Abdul-Jabbar – 6,646
 Jerry West – 6,321
 Elgin Baylor – 5,510
 Derek Fisher – 5,406
 James Worthy – 5,297
 Shaquille O'Neal – 4,992
 Byron Scott – 4,828
 Michael Cooper – 4,744Most points Kobe Bryant – 5,640
 Jerry West – 4,457
 Kareem Abdul-Jabbar – 4,070
 Magic Johnson – 3,701
 Elgin Baylor – 3,623
 Shaquille O'Neal – 3,383
 James Worthy – 3,022
 Byron Scott – 2,223
 Derek Fisher – 1,700
 George Mikan – 1,680Most field goals made Kobe Bryant – 2,014
 Kareem Abdul-Jabbar – 1,643
 Jerry West – 1,622
 Elgin Baylor – 1,388
 Shaquille O'Neal – 1,309
 Magic Johnson – 1,291
 James Worthy – 1,267
 Byron Scott – 864
 Pau Gasol – 600
 Derek Fisher – 582
 Michael Cooper – 582Most field goals attempted Kobe Bryant – 4,499
 Jerry West – 3,460
 Elgin Baylor – 3,151
 Kareem Abdul-Jabbar – 3,024
 Magic Johnson – 2,552
 Shaquille O'Neal – 2,352
 James Worthy – 2,329
 Byron Scott – 1,747
 George Mikan – 1,394
 Derek Fisher – 1,358Most three-point field goals made Kobe Bryant – 292
 Derek Fisher – 219
 Michael Cooper – 124
 Byron Scott – 116
 Robert Horry – 83
 Rick Fox – 82
 Sasha Vujacic – 63
 Nick Van Exel – 60
 Metta World Peace – 59
 Devean George – 52Most three-point field goals attempted Kobe Bryant – 882
 Derek Fisher – 543
 Michael Cooper – 316
 Byron Scott – 286
 Robert Horry – 263
 Rick Fox – 230
 Magic Johnson – 212
 Nick Van Exel – 196
 Metta World Peace – 195
 Sasha Vujacic – 164Most free throws made Kobe Bryant – 1,320
 Jerry West – 1,213
 Magic Johnson – 1,068
 Elgin Baylor – 847
 Kareem Abdul-Jabbar – 784
 Shaquille O'Neal – 765
 George Mikan – 554
 James Worthy – 474
 Byron Scott – 379
 Pau Gasol – 358Most free throws attempted Kobe Bryant – 1,617
 Jerry West – 1,507
 Shaquille O'Neal – 1,472
 Magic Johnson – 1,274
 Elgin Baylor – 1,101
 Kareem Abdul-Jabbar – 1,037
 George Mikan – 705
 Wilt Chamberlain – 667
 James Worthy – 652
 Pau Gasol – 487Most rebounds   Wilt Chamberlain – 	1,783
 	Elgin Baylor – 1,725		
 	Shaquille O'Neal –  1,630
 	Kareem Abdul-Jabbar – 1,525
 	Magic Johnson – 1,465
 	Kobe Bryant – 1,119
   Pau Gasol – 937
 	A. C. Green – 858
 	Jerry West – 855
 	Lamar Odom – 824Most offensive rebounds (since 1973–74) Shaquille O'Neal – 561
 Kareem Abdul-Jabbar – 438
 Magic Johnson – 349
 A.C. Green – 316
 Pau Gasol – 292
 James Worthy – 257
 Kobe Bryant – 230
 Lamar Odom – 219
 Kurt Rambis – 189
 Robert Horry – 183Most defensive rebounds (since 1973–74) Magic Johnson – 1,116
 Kareem Abdul-Jabbar – 1,087
 Shaquille O'Neal – 1,069
 Kobe Bryant – 889
 Pau Gasol – 645
 Lamar Odom – 605
 A.C. Green – 542
 James Worthy – 490
 Kurt Rambis – 438
 Robert Horry – 425Most assists  	Magic Johnson – 2,346
 	Kobe Bryant – 1,040
 	Jerry West – 970
 	Michael Cooper – 703
 	Elgin Baylor – 541 	
 	Kareem Abdul-Jabbar – 540 	
   Derek Fisher – 507
 	Norm Nixon – 465
 	James Worthy – 463 	
 	Shaquille O'Neal – 360Most steals  	Magic Johnson – 358
 	Kobe Bryant – 310
 	Derek Fisher – 219
 	Byron Scott – 204
 	Michael Cooper – 203
 	James Worthy – 177 	
 	Kareem Abdul-Jabbar – 169
 	Robert Horry – 120 		
 	Norm Nixon – 89 	
 	Jamaal Wilkes – 83Most blocks  	Kareem Abdul-Jabbar – 437
 	Shaquille O'Neal – 	310
 	Pau Gasol – 178
 	Kobe Bryant – 144
   Andrew Bynum – 110
 	Lamar Odom – 97
 	James Worthy – 96
   Michael Cooper – 96
 	Elden Campbell – 90
 	Robert Horry – 90
 	Vlade Divac – 89Most personal fouls Kobe Bryant – 660
 Kareem Abdul-Jabbar – 625
 Magic Johnson – 524
 Michael Cooper – 474
 Derek Fisher – 472
 Jerry West – 451
 Elgin Baylor – 435
 Shaquille O'Neal – 415
 Vern Mikkelsen – 397
 Byron Scott – 393Most triple doubles Magic Johnson – 30
 LeBron James – 5
 Elgin Baylor – 4
 Pau Gasol – 1
 Andrew Bynum – 1
 James Worthy – 1
 Wilt Chamberlain – 1
 Jerry West – 1

Other franchise records

 In a game 

 Team (regular season) 
 Largest margin of victory in a home game –  63 (Score: 162 – 99) March 19, 1972 vs. Golden State
 Largest margin of victory in a road game –  47 (Score: 138 – 91) November 12, 1966 @ Detroit
 Largest margin of defeat in a home game –  48 (Score: 142 – 94) March 6, 2014 vs. LA Clippers
 Largest margin of defeat in a road game –  49 (Score: 122 – 73) January 22, 2017 @ Dallas Mavericks
 Fewest points given up in a home game (post shot clock) –  57 (score: 112–57) January 11, 2011 vs. Cleveland
 Most points scored – 162
 Most points allowed – 173 (Score: 173–139) February 27, 1959 @ Boston Celtics
 Most assists – 51
 Most rebounds – 107
 Most blocks – 21
 Most steals – 23
 Most field goals made – 69
 Most field goals attempted – 153
 Most three-point field goals made – 22
 Most three-point field goals attempted – 45
 Most free throws made – 52
 Most free throws attempted – 69
 Most turnovers – 43

 Team (playoffs) 
 Most points scored – 153
 Most points allowed – 148
 Most assists – 44
 Most rebounds – 81
 Most blocks – 15
 Most steals – 19
 Most field goals made – 67
 Most field goals attempted – 116
 Most three-point field goals made – 19
 Most three-point field goals attempted – 31
 Most free throws made – 49
 Most free throws attempted – 68
 Most turnovers – 28

ReferencesGeneralSpecific'''

External links
Points Record
Field Goals Records
Rebound Records
Assists Records
Free Throw Records
Lakers Records

records
National Basketball Association accomplishments and records by team